Ayad Radhi Moenis Al Radwani (February 22, 1964 in Nasiriyah in Dhi Qar Governorate) is an Iraqi stage, film and television actor. He graduated from The Academy of Fine Arts in Baghdad in 1987. Radhi married in 1986 and he has four children.

Television
 Love and Peace (Iraqi serial) (2009)
 Shanashel Haretna (2010)
 Film Hindi (2010)
 Samba (2011)
 Sandeqja (2011)
 The president (2012)
 midday stars (2012)
 Blue and Paper (2014)
 Crazyes family (2014)
 Kama mat Al-Watan (2020)
 Zarag varag(2014-2019)

Awards 
Won the Best actor award at the Golden Crescent Award in Baghdad in 2019.

External links

References

1964 births
Living people
Iraqi male actors
Iraqi male film actors
Iraqi male television actors
20th-century Iraqi male actors
21st-century Iraqi male actors
Iraqi voice actors
Male voice actors